(stylized as ODDTAXI) is a Japanese anime television series. Set in a world of anthropomorphic animals, it tells the story of walrus taxi driver Odokawa, who converses with his customers and learns about various mysteries and oddities occurring in Tokyo, including a schoolgirl's strange disappearance that leads to him being followed by both the police and the yakuza.

The series, produced by OLM and P.I.C.S, was broadcast on TV Tokyo and AT-X from April to June 2021, and was licensed by Crunchyroll in North America and Mighty Media in Southeast Asia. Prior to its release, a manga from Shogakukan (via Big Comics) began publication in January 2021, and was serialized in its Superior Dalpana magazine till July 2022. An anime film, Odd Taxi: In the Woods, was released in Japan in April 2022.

Plot
Set in a world of anthropomorphic animals, Odd Taxi tells the story of Odokawa, a 41-year old walrus taxi driver whose parents abandoned him in elementary school, leaving him generally asocial. However, he usually has conversations with other animal inhabitants who ride in his taxi on their respective journeys around Tokyo, where the series is set. Odokawa's conversations with these people unravel into a series of mysteries and acts of violence, including that of a missing high school girl. Because of the case of the missing girl, the police have been tracking leads back to him, and now he is being followed by both the yakuza and the police.

Characters

A middle-aged taxi driver walrus who often maintains a melancholic attitude. Loves to lose himself in various radio programs on and off the job.

A young alpaca nurse at Goriki's clinic who seems cheerful but sells some of the clinic's drugs on the black market to pay off her debt. She studies capoeira as a hobby.

A middle-aged gorilla doctor and Odokawa's primary physician who runs his own clinic.

Odokawa's drinking buddy, a middle-aged white gibbon who works as a janitor and tries to pick up women through a dating app.

A toy poodle and the lead singer of "Mystery Kiss," a new idol group looking to make it big.

A calico cat and one of Mystery Kiss backup singers, forced by her manager to engage in multiple "badger games" to scam money out of rich men.

A black cat, one of Mystery Kiss backup singers, she was athletic and talented, and was about to replace Rui as lead singer before her mysterious death. It is later revealed that her real name is Sakura Wadagaki that served as a substitute for the real Yuki Mitsuya before Mystery Kiss's debut.

A pair of meerkat identical twins who usually work together as cops. Kenshiro, the older brother, is a cynical, crooked cop who looks the other way in exchange for bribes. Koshiro, the younger brother, has a strong sense of justice and naively trusts his older brother.

A wild boar who plays the boke (funny man) of the manzai comedy duo Homosapiens. He works part-time at a cabaret club to make ends meet while trying to make his comedy career take off.

A horse who plays the tsukkomi (straight man) of the manzai comedy duo Homosapiens. Baba finds himself shooting up in popularity and TV appearances but still thinks Shibagaki is the funnier member of their duo.

A dwarf hippopotamus college student addicted to social media, desperately in search of a picture or video that will make him go "viral" online.

A female kangaroo izakaya owner who runs Yamabiko, the izakaya Odokawa and many of his acquaintances frequent.

A giant panda comedian and member of the comedy duo Bonnou Illumination with Kondo.

A cheetah comedian and member of the comedy duo Bonnou Illumination with Fukumoto.

A gelada baboon gangster and bagman under Kuroda, he suspects Odokawa is somehow involved with the missing girl case. He is a rival of Yano. Dobu (どぶ) is an alternative reading of 溝, the first kanji of his name, which means ditch.

A skunk who is one of Mystery Kiss's first ever fans. He has been obsessively following the group and tries to attend every concert and buy their merch when he can. He works part-time at a cabaret club and buys lottery tickets to fund his hobby.

A puma who is part of a video game development team. He became obsessed with obtaining an in-game rarity, a dodo, in a mobile game to make up his past foolish mistake as a child. Becomes unhinged and declares vengeance on Odokawa after he breaks his phone and loses the dodo due to his taxi swerving in front of him.

The red fox manager of Mystery Kiss who also has an interest in the missing girl case.

A tracksuit-wearing polar bear member of the yakuza, who acts as Yano's bodyguard

A tapir yakuza boss who oversees Dobu and Yano.

 A tabby cat freelancer and aspiring idol.

 A rabbit freelancer and follower of Kabasawa.

A porcupine that is Dobu's rival in the same yakuza syndicate. He always speaks in rhymes as if rapping instead of talking.

A giraffe high-school student who is an obsessive fan of Homosapiens, writing them letters almost every week. Satoshi also runs his own amateur podcast.

Media

Anime
The anime television series aired on TV Tokyo and AT-X in Japan from April 6 to June 29, 2021. It is directed and storyboarded by Baku Kinoshita and written by Kazuya Konomoto while Konomoto and Hiromi Nakayama designed the characters. The music for the series is composed by OMSB, PUNPEE and VaVa. The series' first 4 episodes had an advanced screening on March 20, 2021 featuring the cast of the series, while a special digest version of those episodes was also streamed online. Singer-songwriter Skirt and rapper/DJ PUNPEE performed the series' main theme "Odd Taxi", while Suzuko Mimori performed the series' ending theme song "Sugarless Kiss". Crunchyroll streamed the series in North American territories. Mighty Media has licensed the series in Southeast Asian territories.

The production committee originally had no plans to release a Blu-Ray Box set, but due to audience demand, it was announced that a Blu-Ray boxset will be released if at least 300 pre-orders would be made during a pre-order campaign. Pony Canyon reported that at least 500 pre-orders were made at a cost of 27,500 Yen ($USD246).

On October 28, 2021, Crunchyroll announced that the series will receive an English dub, which was originally set for release on January 16, 2022. However, it was rescheduled for a release on February 14 instead.

Episode list

Audio drama
An audio drama ran concurrently to the anime, being uploaded on the anime's official Youtube channel, with the first episode released on April 6, 2021. The drama follows conversations between characters transmitted from a bugged pen which is shown throughout the series.

Manga
A manga adaptation written by Kazuya Konomoto and illustrated by Takeichi Abaraya began serialization on Shogakukan's Superior Dalpana digital manga site on January 15, 2021 and ended on July 22, 2022. It was collected into five tankōbon volumes.

A manga series based on a new project titled RoOT/Route of Odd Taxi began serialization on the same platform on February 24, 2023.

Novel
A novel adaptation by Manabu Wakui, based on Kazuya Konomoto script, was released on July 6, 2021. The novel is a retelling of several key moments of the anime from the point of view of different characters.

Film

On December 25, 2021, an anime film adaptation titled Odd Taxi: In the Woods was announced. The cast and staff from the series returned to reprise their roles. It was released in Japan on April 1, 2022.

Music
Episode 6 featured the special ending theme 壁の向こうに笑い声を聞きましたか (Kabe no Mukou ni Waraigoe wo Kikimashita ka, Did you hear the laughter beyond the wall?) by Japanese singer Tony Frank. METEOR, the voice actor for Yano, released an album titled 2019 under the SUMMIT label that features compositions from the perspective of his character.

Other media
A Twitter account was set up prior to the show's release featuring tweets written by hippopotamus character Kabasawa Taichi throughout the show's events under the handle @kbsw_t. The most popular post under the handle was posted on October 10, 2020, and features a selfie between the protagonist Odokawa and Kabasawa, with the tweet attracting attention in April when the episode aired in Japan.

Reception
Odd Taxi was listed by The New Yorker'''s "Best TV of 2021" list as an honorable mention. Reviewer Doreen St. Félix stated that the show's "noir humor ... made [her] feel crazy—in a good way". The show was named as the Best Anime of the Year by IGN, describing Odd Taxi as "a fascinating mystery drama with incredible writing, deeply developed and memorable characters, and a unique art style that stands out". Austin Jones and Reuben Baron listed Odd Taxi as the "Best New Anime Series" of 2021 in Paste'', describing the show as "one of the best anime of recent years, and unlike anything else out there right now" remarking on the "banter between the cast’s characters [revealing] a deeply human view of modern life".

Awards and nominations

Notes

References

External links
Official anime website 

2021 anime television series debuts
2021 manga
Animated television series about animals
Anime with original screenplays
Crunchyroll anime
Japanese webcomics
Mystery anime and manga
OLM, Inc.
Seinen manga
Shogakukan manga
TV Tokyo original programming
Webcomics in print
Works about taxis
Yakuza in anime and manga